A tram, tramcar, or streetcar, is a vehicle used on a rail-based public transport system which runs primarily on streets; also used in mining.

Tram (or trams) may also mean:

Transport 
 TRAM (company), a Spanish transportation company
 Aerial tramway
 Light rail, a vehicle running on streets
 Trackless train, sometimes called parking lot trams or just "trams"
 Tramcar (Wildwood), Boardwalk, Wildwood, New Jersey, US
 Transit Museum Society (TRAMS), Vancouver, Canada

Acronym 
 TRAM (genetic), genetic systems with Turnover, Redundancy And Modularity
 TRAM flap, Transverse Rectus Abdominis Myocutaneous flap, in surgical breast reconstruction
 Texture memory, in computer storage
 Target Recognition and Attack Multi-Sensor system, on U.S. Navy A-6E Intruder aircraft
 Teatr RAbochey Molodyozhi, the Russian acronym for Leningrad Workers' Youth Theatre
 TRAnsputer Module, see

Other uses 
 Tram (band)
 Tram (film), a short animation
 Tram, Kentucky
 "The Tram", an episode of the Italian TV series Door into Darkness
 Caesura, a musical symbol known as "tram-lines" in the UK

See also 
 Tramway (disambiguation)